Louis van Dyck (21 January 1862 – 4 December 1937) was a Belgian Catholic priest, missionary, and Bishop of the Roman Catholic Archdiocese of Suiyuan between 1915 and 1937.

Biography
Louis van Dyck was born in Loenhout, Flemish Region, Belgium, on 21 January 1862. He joined the CICM Missionaries in 1882. He was ordained a priest on 30 May 1885. He came to Mongolia to preach in 1887. On 10 August 1915 the Holy See appointed Louis van Dyck as Bishop of the Roman Catholic Archdiocese of Suiyuan to replace the dead Bishop Alfonso Bermyn. He was consecrated on 23 January 1916.

He retired in 1937, and died on 4 December that year, aged 75.

References

1862 births
1937 deaths
People from Wuustwezel
20th-century Belgian Roman Catholic priests
20th-century Roman Catholic bishops in China